Micrantheum serpentinum, the western tridentbush, is a species of shrub or small tree in the family Picrodendraceae, endemic to Tasmania.

Description
Micrantheum serpentinium is a woody shrub which reaches up to 3m tall. The leaves are 5 to 9mm long and 1.5 to 3.3mm wide. Yellow to greenish flowers typically appear in spring (from September to November). Both male and female flowers appear on the same plant. They arise from the base of the leaves.
They are solitary or found in small groups. The fruit is yellow-brown, oval shaped, 3 to 3.3mm long and 2.3 to 2.7mm wide.
The fruits have purple-black protrusions at the top and reach maturity in summer (around January).

References

Picrodendraceae
Malpighiales of Australia
Flora of Tasmania
Endemic flora of Tasmania